Systematization in Romania was a program of urban planning carried out by the Romanian Communist Party under the leadership of Nicolae Ceaușescu. Ceaușescu was impressed by the ideological mobilization and mass adulation of North Korea under its Juche ideology during his East Asia visit in 1971, and issued the July Theses shortly afterwards.

Beginning in 1974, systematization consisted largely of the demolition and reconstruction of existing hamlets, villages, towns, and cities, in whole or in part, with the stated goal of turning Romania into a "multilaterally developed socialist society".

Reconstruction of rural areas 

Romania has traditionally been a largely rural country. The vast majority of the population lived in villages when the communist regime came to power after World War II; and by the early 60s, the rural population still amounted for two thirds of the country population. 

Systematization began as a programme of rural resettlement. The original plan was to bring the advantages of the modern age to the Romanian countryside. For some years, rural Romanians had been migrating to the cities (including Ceaușescu himself). Systematization called for doubling the number of Romanian cities by 1990. Hundreds of villages were to become urban industrial centres via investment in schools, medical clinics, housing, and industry.

As part of this plan, smaller villages (typically those with populations under 1,000) were deemed "irrational" and listed for reduction of services or forced removal of the population and physical destruction. Often, such measures were extended to the towns that were destined to become urbanized, by demolishing some of the older buildings and replacing them with modern multi-storey apartment blocks. Some of these towns include Bezidu Nou, Ganaș, Eteni and Cucu.

Although the systematization plan extended, in theory, to the entire country, initial work centred in Moldavia. It also affected such places as Ceaușescu's own native village of Scornicești in Olt County: there, the Ceaușescu family home was the only older building left standing. The initial phase of systematization largely petered out by 1980, at which point only about 10 per cent of new housing was being built in rural areas.

Given the lack of budget, in many regions systematization did not constitute an effective plan, good or bad, for development. Instead, it constituted a barrier against organic regional growth. New buildings had to be at least two storeys high, so peasants could not build small houses. Yards were restricted to 250 square metres (2,700 sq. ft.) and private agricultural plots were banned from within the villages. Despite a perceived impact of such a scheme on subsistence agriculture, after 1981 villages were required to be agriculturally self-sufficient.

In the 1980s, nearby villages surrounding Bucharest were demolished, often in service of large scale projects such as a canal from Bucharest to the Danube – projects which were later abandoned by Romania's post-communist government.

Cities 

In cities, the systematization programme consisted of demolishing existing buildings (often historic) and constructing new ones. Iași, for instance, underwent major transformations in the 1970s and 1980s. Although tower blocks and other socialist-era buildings are present in all big cities across Romania, the degree to which the historic buildings (old town areas of cities) were affected varies by city. For instance old historical architecture managed to largely escape demolition in some cities, particularly in cities such as Cluj, where the reconstruction schemes affected primarily the marginal, shoddily built districts surrounding the historical city centre.

Bucharest Civic Centre 

The demolition campaign erased many monuments including 3 monasteries, 20 churches, 3 synagogues, 3 hospitals, 2 theatres, and a noted Art Deco sports stadium. This also involved evicting 40,000 people with only a single day's notice and relocating them to new homes.

Reactions 

Systematization, especially the destruction of historic churches and monasteries, was protested against by several nations, especially Hungary and West Germany, each concerned for their national minorities in Transylvania. Despite these protests, Ceaușescu remained in the relatively good graces of the United States and other Western powers almost to the last, largely because his relatively independent political line rendered him a useful counter to the Soviet Union in Cold War politics.

See also 
Urban planning in communist countries
Ceaușima
Juche
Hunger circus
 HLM (France)
Street dogs in Bucharest 

Eastern bloc housing:
Panelák (Czechoslovakia)
Panelház (Hungary)
Plattenbau (East Germany)
Ugsarmal bair (Mongolia)
Khrushchyovka (Soviet Union)

Bibliography 
Anania, Lidia; Luminea, Cecilia; Melinte, Livia; Prosan, Ana-Nina; Stoica, Lucia; and Ionescu-Ghinea, Neculai, Bisericile osândite de Ceaușescu. București 1977–1989 (1995). Editura Anastasia, Bucharest, . In Romanian. Title means "Churches doomed by Ceaușescu". This is very much focused on churches, but along the way provides many details about systematization, especially the demolition to make way for Centrul Civic.
Bucica, Cristina. Legitimating Power in Capital Cities: Bucharest – Continuity Through Radical Change? (PDF), 2000.

References 

Socialist Republic of Romania
Society of Romania
Urban planning in Romania
Economic history of Romania